The 2018 North American, Central American and Caribbean Championships was a regional track and field competition held at Varsity Stadium in Toronto, Canada, from August 10–12, 2018. It was the third edition of a senior track and field championship for the NACAC region, held three years after the 2015 NACAC Championships. The winner of each event qualified (granted their country would ultimately pick them) for the 2019 Pan American Games competition, which was held in Lima, Peru.

Medal summary

Men

Only three competitors were in the men's pole vault, with the third placed athlete not registering a height. This meant a bronze medal was not awarded.

Women

Medal table

Participating nations
According to an unofficial count, 319 athletes from 29 countries participated.

Schedule

See also
Athletics at the 2019 Pan American Games – Qualification

References

External links
Toronto 2018 Official Website
Official NACAC website

NACAC Championships
2018 in Canadian sports
2018 in Toronto
International track and field competitions hosted by Canada
International sports competitions in Toronto
NACAC Championships in Athletics
Qualification tournaments for the 2019 Pan American Games
NACAC Championships